The Château de Galié is a ruined 13-14th century castle in the commune of Galié in the Haute-Garonne département of France. Privately owned, it has been listed since 1970 as a monument historique by the French Ministry of Culture.

See also
List of castles in France

References

Castles in Haute-Garonne
Monuments historiques of Haute-Garonne
Ruined castles in Occitania (administrative region)